The scutum (plural scuta) was a type of shield used among Italic peoples in antiquity, most notably by the army of ancient Rome starting about the fourth century BC.

The Romans adopted it when they switched from the military formation of the hoplite phalanx of the Greeks to the formation with maniples. In the former, the soldiers carried a round shield, which the Romans called a clipeus. In the latter, they used the scutum, which was larger. Originally it was oblong and convex, but by the first century BC it had developed into the rectangular, semi-cylindrical shield that is popularly associated with the scutum in modern times. This was not the only kind the Romans used; Roman shields were of varying types depending on the role of the soldier who carried it. Oval, circular and rectangular shapes were used throughout Roman history.

History

The first depictions of the scutum are by the Este culture in the 8th century bc, and subsequently spread to the Italians, Illyrians, and Celts. 

The hoplites were heavy infantrymen who originally wore bronze shields and helmets. The phalanx was a compact, rectangular mass military formation. The soldiers lined up in very tight ranks in a formation that was eight lines deep. The phalanx advanced in unison, which encouraged cohesion among the troops. It formed a shield wall and a mass of spears pointing towards the enemy. Its compactness provided a thrusting force that had a great impact on the enemy and made frontal assaults against it very difficult. However, it worked only if the soldiers kept the formation tight and had the discipline needed to keep its compactness in the thick of the battle. It was a rigid form of fighting and its maneuverability was limited. The small shields provided less protection. However, their smaller size afforded more mobility. Their round shape enabled the soldiers to interlock them to hold the line together.

Sometime in the early fourth century BC, the Romans changed their military tactics from the hoplite phalanx to the manipular formation, which was much more flexible. This involved a change in military equipment. The scutum replaced the clipeus. Some ancient writers thought that the Romans had adopted the maniples and the scutum when they fought against the Samnites in the first or second Samnite War (343–341 BC, 327–304 BC). However, Livy did not mention the scutum being a Samnite shield and wrote that the oblong shield and the manipular formation were introduced in the early fourth century BC, before the conflicts between the Romans and the Samnites. Plutarch mentioned the use of the long shield in a battle that took place in 366 BC. Couissin notes archaeological evidence shows that the scutum was in general use among Italic peoples long before the Samnite Wars and argues that it was not obtained from the Samnites. In some parts of Italy the scutum had been used since pre-historical times.

Polybius gave a description of the early second-century scutum BC: 

Roman rectangular scutums of later eras were smaller than Republican oval scutums and often varied in length - approximately 37"-42" tall (approximately 3 to 3.5 imperial feet, covering about from shoulder to top of knee), and 24-33" wide (approximately 2 to 2.7 imperial feet). 

The oval scutum is depicted on the Altar of Domitius Ahenobarbus in Rome, the Aemilius Paullus monument at Delphi, and there is an actual example found at Kasr el-Harit in Egypt. Gradually the scutum evolved into the rectangular (or sub-rectangular) type of the early Roman Empire.

By the end of the 3rd century the rectangular scutum seems to have disappeared. Fourth century archaeological finds (especially from the fortress of Dura-Europos) indicate the subsequent use of oval or round shields which were not semi-cylindrical but were either dished (bowl-shaped) or flat. Roman artwork from the end of the 3rd century until the end of Antiquity show soldiers wielding oval or round shields.

The word "scutum" survived the Roman Empire and entered the military vocabulary of the Byzantine Empire. Even in the 11th century, the Byzantines called their armoured soldiers skutatoi (Grk. σκυτατοί), and several modern Romance languages use derivatives of the word.

Structure
The scutum was a  
large rectangle curved shield made from three sheets of wood glued together and covered with canvas and leather, usually with a spindle shaped boss along the vertical length of the shield.

It is made from strips of wood that are 30 to 80 millimetres (1.2 to 3.1 in) wide and 1.5 to 2 millimetres (0.059 to 0.079 in) thick. They are put together in three layers, so that the total thickness of the wood layer is 4.5 to 6 millimetres (0.18 to 0.24 in). It was likely well made and extremely sturdy.

Advantages and disadvantages
The scutum was light enough to be held in one hand and its large height and width covered the entire wielder, making him very unlikely to be hit by missile fire and in hand-to-hand combat. The metal boss, or umbo, in the centre of the scutum also made it an auxiliary punching weapon. Its composite construction meant that early versions of the scutum could fail from a heavy cutting or piercing blow, which was experienced in the Roman campaigns against Carthage and Dacia where the falcata and falx could easily penetrate and rip through it. The effects of these weapons prompted design changes that made the scutum more resilient such as thicker planks and metal edges.

The aspis, which it replaced, provided less protective coverage than the scutum but was much more durable.

Combat uses

According to Polybius, the scutum gave Roman soldiers an edge over their Carthaginian enemies during the Punic Wars: 
"Their arms also give the men both protection and confidence, which they owed to the size of the shield."

The Roman writer Suetonius recorded anecdotes of the heroic centurion Cassius Scaeva and legionary Gaius Acilius who fought under Caesar in the Battle of Dyrrachium and the battle of Massilia, respectively:

The Roman writer Cassius Dio in his Roman History described Roman against Roman in the Battle of Philippi: "For a long time there was pushing of shield against shield and thrusting with the sword, as they were at first cautiously looking for a chance to wound others without being wounded themselves."

The shape of the scutum allowed packed formations of legionaries to overlap their shields to provide an effective barrier against projectiles. The most novel (and specialised, for it afforded negligible protection against other attacks) use was the testudo (Latin for "tortoise"), which added legionaries holding shields from above to protect against descending projectiles (such as arrows, spears, or objects thrown by defenders on walls).

Dio gives an account of a testudo put to good use by Marc Antony's men while on campaign in Armenia:

However, the testudo was not invincible, as Dio also gives an account of a Roman shield array being defeated by Parthian knights and horse archers at the Battle of Carrhae:

Special uses
Cassius Dio describes scuta being used to aid an ambush:

Dio also notes the use of the scutum as a tool of psychological warfare during the capture of Syracuse:

In 27 BC, the emperor Augustus was awarded a golden shield by the senate for his part in ending the civil war and restoring the republic, according to the Res Gestae Divi Augusti. The shield, the Res Gestae says, was hung outside the Curia Julia, serving as a symbol of the princeps "valour, clemency, justice and piety".
The 5th century writer Vegetius added that scuta helped in identification:

Other uses of the word
The name Scutum has been adopted as one of the 88 modern constellations, and by UK luxury clothing maker Aquascutum, which became famous in the 19th century for its waterproof menswear. Hence the name, which in Latin means "water shield".

In zoology, the term scute or scutum is used for a flat and hardened part of the anatomy of an animal, such as the shell of a turtle.

See also
 Clipeus (shield)
 Imago clipeata (shield portrait)
 Parma (shield)

Notes

References
 James, Simon (2004). Excavations at Dura-Europos 1928–1937. Final Report VII. The Arms and Armour and Other Military Equipment. London: British Museum Press. .
 McDowall, Simon (1994). Late Roman Infantryman AD236–565. Osprey Publishing. 
 Nabbefeld, Ansgar (2008). Roman Shields. Studies on archaeological finds and iconographic evidence from the end of Republic to the late Empire. Cologne. 
 Robinson, H.R. (1975). The Armour of Imperial Rome. London: Arms and Armour Press. .

External links

 
  for online translations of Plutarch, Polybius, Cassius Dio and other antique authors
  for the Study and Photographs of Roman Legion and Auxillia Shield and Painting Patterns

Ancient Roman legionary equipment
Roman shields
Wood products